{{Infobox ethnic group
|group     = AmboneseMoluccans
|native_name = Orang Ambon
|image     = 
|caption   = Ambonese women performing a dance on Queen's Day, 1921.
|poptime   = 
|popplace  = 
|languages = Ambonese Malay, Indonesian (in Indonesia), Dutch (in Netherlands)
|religions =  Christianity (Protestantism, Reformed Church), Roman Catholicism), Islam (Sunni Islam)
|related   = Melanesians, Polynesians, Moluccans
}}

The Ambonese, also known as Moluccans', are an Indonesian ethnic group of mixed Austronesian and Melanesian origin. They are majority Christians followed by Muslims. The Ambonese are from Ambon Island in Maluku, an island group east of Sulawesi and north of Timor in Indonesia. They also live on the southwest of Seram Island; which is part of the Moluccas, Java, New Guinea; on the West Papua side and other regions of Indonesia. Additionally, there are about 35,000 Ambonese people living in the Netherlands. By the end of the 20th century, there were 258,331 (2007 census) Ambonese people living in Ambon, Maluku.

 Language 

The predominant language of the island is Ambonese Malay, also called Ambonese. It developed as the trade language of central Maluku, and is spoken elsewhere in Maluku as a second language. Bilingualism in Indonesian is high around Ambon City. They are an ethnic mixture of Austronesians and the Melanesians.

 Religion 

The Ambonese ethnicity is split of Christian (Reformed Christianity and Roman Catholicism) and Muslim (Sunni Islam), while indigenous customs such as tattooing have largely disappeared. According to Mikhail Anatolievich Chlenov, relationship between the adherents of both faiths here have traditionally been neighborly peaceful, based on the union of the communities' pela; which in the Ambonese language means "friend". However, he also mentions that clashes between Ambonese people and other non-indigenous ethnic groups occurs on religious grounds. Mounted tension then resulted in the 1998 inter-religious conflict in Ambon, of which until today the number of victims have turned into thousands of people. In the situation of an almost civil war, people were forced to move to refugee camps across the capital of the island, Ambon, Maluku, with lines dividing its Muslim and Christian sections were made. The problem is not completely resolved, and the religious issue is still acute, as indeed, in other parts of Indonesia.

 History 

Ambon belonged to the so-called colonial ethnic group. They were formed in the 16th to 18th century as a result of the mixing of the indigenous population of Ambon Island and West Seram Regency, the human trade of the Hitu people, and with the immigrants from both other parts of Indonesia and Europeans. In the 15th to 16th century, the largest center of spice trade was established under the rule of the Sultanate of Ternate, and its capture then became the goal of the foreign colonialists, who at the beginning of the 16th century were the Portuguese colonials, and at the beginning of the 17th century the Dutch colonials.

The Ambonese people resisted the Dutch colonization until the beginning of the 19th century. However, their resistance did not help in preventing the Dutch conquering the Indonesian Archipelago and suppressing uprisings of local ethnic groups against the colonialists. Due to its far-sighted policy, the Ambonese people have achieved a privileged position in Indonesia since the mid-19th century. Many of them were Europeanized, adopted Christianity, the wealthy townspeople were legally equated with the ruling colonizers, and they were involved in state and military services. For such loyalty, the Ambonese authorities were nicknamed "black Dutch".

During the Indonesian National Revolution war for the Independence of Indonesia in 1945–1949, large groups of Ambonese people, especially members of the colonial army, emigrated to the Netherlands and New Guinea.

 Economy 

At present, the Ambonese people are considered one of the most developed peoples of Indonesia, belong to the class of local intellectuals. Mostly engaged in the production for sale of spices such as carnation and nutmeg, as well as sago as a food source. Since the 17th century, they were producers of nutmeg; which led to the conquest of the Dutch colonial in Ambon Island and its surrounding region in 1605 as an attempt to monopolized the nutmeg trade, and finally the Amboyna massacre. Developed fishery, agriculture, horticulture and small trades are also means of earning a living. Ambonese craftsmen work in various industries such as pottery, blacksmithing, weapons making, shipbuilding, carving on tortoiseshell shell and mother of pearl, making ornamental crafts from buds of carnation, weaving boxes and mats from strips of palm leaves. Traditionally, they serve in the army and the administrative sector.

 Social structure 

The Ambonese people live in traditional rural communities, called Negri and headed by a starosta called raja. Communities are divided into territorial-related groups called soa, which, in turn, unites the patrilineal clans that are called mata ruma. Marriages are concluded only within confessional groups. For the Ambonese people, they have been traditionally characterized by patrilocal marriage settlement. Relations between members of the community are regulated by traditional norms of behavior called adat, coming from the customs of the ancestors. Today the adat largely regulates matter on family, hereditary, land law, as well as on elections for leadership positions.

 Culture and lifestyle 

A typical Ambonese village consists of about 1,500 people who live in houses made of materials from woven sago leaves or plastered bamboo, wood, coral stones, on stone foundations; they cultivate surrounding hillsides. Traditional rural settlements of Ambonese people are located on the shore and have a linear layout. Houses are built on stilts.

 Clothings 
Men adopted modern European style clothing, and only on special occasions they would wear short jackets and black trousers. Women also wear thin blouse or small-patterned sarong with black color for the older women and the younger women wear bright colored cotton dresses up to knee-length.

 Food 
The basis of the diet of Ambonese people is a porridge of sago starch, vegetables, taro, cassava, and fish. The inhabitants of the Ambon Island also have access to imported rice.

 Music 
The Ambonese people have rich musical folklore, many of which have absorbed many European musical elements, for example, the Ambonese quadrille (katreji) and the songs of the lagoon, accompanied by a violin and with a lap steel guitar. As of traditional musical instruments such as the 12 gongs, drums, bamboo flute (efluit), xylophone (tatabuhan kayu'') and Aeolian harp are included.

References 

Ethnic groups in Indonesia
Melanesian people